Tayalur  is a panchayat village in the southern state of Karnataka, India. It is located in the Mulbagal Taluka of Kolar district in Karnataka.

Divisions
The Tayalur gram panchayat governs six villages:
 T. Agara
 Badenahalli
 Dasepalli
 Kothapalli
 Tayalur
 Tirumanahalli

See also
 Kolar

References

External links
 http://Kolar.nic.in/

Villages in Kolar district